Bernard de Walque (born 4 April 1938 in Antwerp) is a Belgian architect. He lives and works in Belgium.

Biography
He was professor and project leader for the architecture school "La Cambre" in Brussels.

He participated in the founding of the city of Louvain-la-Neuve, and is a member and founder in 1968 of the Archive of Modern Architecture in Brussels, where he served on the board of directors as treasurer.

He has worked with Maurice Culot in writing popular books on architecture.

His publications
Les mots de la maison, Maurice Culot, Sophie Le Clercq, Bernard de Walque, Marc Frère, Liliane Liesens, Philippe Rotthier, Brussels, Archives d’Architecture Moderne Junior, 1995, 
De stad in woorden. Deel 1 : Straten en buurten / Catherine Cnudde, Maurice Culot, Bernard de Walque ... et al. ; adaptation in Dutch: Esther Tamsma, Jan Mot with Francis Strauven, 
De stad in woorden. Deel II : De gebouwen / Catherine Cnudde, Maurice Culot, Bernard de Walque ... et al. ; adaptation into Dutch linguage: Esther Tamsma, Jan Mot with Francis Strauven, 
Liane Liesens, Cités-jardins, 1920-1940, en Belgique, Archives d'architecture moderne (Brussels, Belgium), Centre Wallonie-Bruxelles (Paris, France) - 1994 (collaboration of Bernard de Walque, with Anne Lauwers, Catherine Cnudde),

Filmography
 Interview of Bernard de Walque coucerning the creation of Louvain-la-Neuve, archives RTBF (Belgian Television), 2009.

Notes

Belgian architects
Living people
1938 births